Islip is a surname. Notable people with the surname include:

Ernie Islip (1892–1941), English footballer
John Islip (1464–1532), Abbot of Westminster
Simon Islip (died 1366), Archbishop of Canterbury